Caperonotus tucurui is a species of beetle in the family Cerambycidae. It was described by Napp and Monne in 2008.

References

Compsocerini
Beetles described in 2008